Richard Woltereck (6 April 1877 – 23 February 1944) was a German zoologist best known for developing the concept of reaction norm (German: Reaktionsnorm). He also conducted some of the first research that provided evidence for the process of cytoplasmic inheritance. He proposed the concept in a 1909 paper that he presented to the German Zoological Society, based on his own research on the Daphnia water flea. According to historian Raphael Falk, the concept of the reaction norm was later revived by Richard Lewontin.

References

Further reading

1877 births
1944 deaths
20th-century German zoologists
Scientists from Hanover
University of Freiburg alumni
Academic staff of Leipzig University